The Spanish football champions are the winners of the primary football competition in Spain, La Liga. The league is contested on a round robin basis and the championship awarded to the team that is top of the league at the end of the season. La Liga, first established in 1929, originally contained ten teams. Before La Liga's organisation, the Copa del Rey—a regionalised cup competition—was effectively the national championship. La Liga is contested by 20 teams; the three lowest-placed teams are relegated to the Segunda División and replaced by the top three teams in that division. Of the founding teams in La Liga, only Athletic Bilbao, Barcelona and Real Madrid have not been relegated. The league was cancelled between 1936 and 1939 because of the Spanish Civil War.

Real Madrid are the most successful club with 35 titles. Barcelona has won the Spanish version of the double the most times, having won the league and cup in the same year eight times in history, three more than Athletic Bilbao's five. Barcelona is one of two UEFA clubs (along with Bayern Munich who joined them in 2020) to have won the treble twice, after accomplishing this feat for a second time in 2015. The current champions are Real Madrid, who won the 2021–22 title.

Champions

 The "Top scorer(s)" column refers to the player who scored the most goals during that season
 The "Goals" column refers to the number of goals scored by the top scorer in the league in that season

Total La Liga titles won
Clubs in bold are competing in La Liga as of the 2022–23 season.

By city

By Autonomous Community

See also
La Liga
Copa del Rey
Supercopa de España
Football in Spain
Primera División (women) (Spanish women's champions)

Notes

References
Bibliography
 

Citations

Champions
Spain
La Liga